The Itasca was a 190-foot US Coast Guard brigantine-rigged cutter.

Its commissioning ushered in a new age of training with more modern equipment, and a triple-expansion steam engine that could power the cutter when sailing was not possible.

In 1907, the Bancroft was recommissioned as the Itasca, named after Lake Itasca in Minnesota.  The Coast Guard sold the Itasca in 1922.

References

Ships of the United States Coast Guard
1892 ships
Brigantines